Roy Guzmán may refer to:
 Roy G. Guzmán, Honduran-American poet
 Roy F. Guzmán, composer